Shurab (also Romanized as Shūrāb) is a village in Khorram Dasht Rural District, in the Central District of Kashan County, Isfahan Province, Iran. At the 2006 census, its population was 14, in 6 families.

References 

Populated places in Kashan County